Deh-e Kan is a village in Gonbaki Rural District, in the Central District of Rigan County, Kerman Province, Iran. At the 2006 census, its population was 110, in 25 families.

References 

Populated places in Rigan County